Thana Bhawan Assembly constituency is one of the 403 constituencies of the Uttar Pradesh Legislative Assembly, India. It is a part of the Shamli district (prior to 2012, Thana Bhawan was a part of Muzaffarnagar district) and one of the five assembly constituencies in the Kairana Lok Sabha constituency. First elections in Thana Bhawan Assembly constituency were held in 1974 after the "Delimitation Orders (1967)" was passed. The extant and serial number of this constituency was last defined in "Delimitation of Parliamentary and Assembly Constituencies Order, 2008".

Wards / Areas

Extent of Thana Bhawan Assembly is Thana Bhawan, Taprana, Purmafee, Nonagali, Silawar, Gadhipukhta, Malandi, Tana, Goharni, Rajhad, Bhainswal-1, Sikka, Kairi, Babri, Butrada, Sonta, Banti Kheda, Karodahathi, Kaservakalan, Titauli of Shamli KC, Garhi pukhta NP, Thana Bhawan NP & Jalalabad NP of Shamli Tehsil; PCs Pindaura Jahangirpur, Hathchhoya & Mundet of Un KC of Kairana Tehsil in Shamli district.

Members of the Legislative Assembly

Election Results

2022

17th Vidhan Sabha: 2017 Assembly Elections

16th Vidhan Sabha: 2012 Assembly Elections.

15th Vidhan Sabha: 2007 Assembly Elections.

See also

Shamli district
Kairana Lok Sabha constituency
Government of Uttar Pradesh
List of Vidhan Sabha constituencies of Uttar Pradesh
Uttar Pradesh
Uttar Pradesh Legislative Assembly

References

External links
 

Assembly constituencies of Uttar Pradesh
Shamli district